The following is a list of Real Sporting managers from the beginning of the club's official managerial records in 1921 to the present day.

Since 1921, Real Sporting had, with the current one, 53 managers in all its history. The first coach was Austrian Karl Orth, who spent two years in Gijón. 39 coaches were from Spain and only 14 of them foreign ones.

The club's longest-serving manager in La Liga is José Manuel Díaz Novoa, who had six spells managing the club from 1979 to 1999, totalling 226 league matches, followed by Manolo Preciado with 218 (the manager who coached more games consecutively) and Vicente Miera, with 166.

List of managers
Only league games are counted, including the playoffs games.

References 

Sporting de Gijon
Managers
Managers